Now That's What I Call Music! 17 may refer to two Now That's What I Call Music!-series albums and others:
 Now That's What I Call Music 17 (UK Series), 1990 release
 Now That's What I Call Music! 17 (U.S. series), 2004 release